Mount Endeavour is an  summit  north of the base of Ketchum Ridge in the southern part of Endeavour Massif, Kirkwood Range, Victoria Land. The name "Mount Endeavour" was given to the south block of the Kirkwood Range by the New Zealand Northern Survey Party of the Commonwealth Trans-Antarctic Expedition in October 1957, but in subsequent New Zealand and U.S. maps the name is identified as the summit described above. Following additional mapping by the United States Geological Survey in 1999 and consultation between the Advisory Committee on Antarctic Names and the New Zealand Geographic Board, the name "Endeavour Massif" was approved for the south block of the Kirkwood Range. For the sake of historical continuity the name "Mount Endeavour" has been retained for the summit near Ketchum Ridge. The summit and the massif are named after HMNZS Endeavour (formerly John Biscoe), a supply ship to the 1957 New Zealand Northern Survey Party.

References 

Mountains of Victoria Land
Scott Coast